Garden County Junior-Senior High School is a secondary school in Oshkosh, Nebraska, United States. It is the only high school in Garden County Schools.

History
Public education in Oshkosh dates to around 1900, and the high school was formally established on June 26, 1915.

Campus

Curriculum

Extracurricular activities
Student groups and activities at include drama, journalism, speech, student council, and vocal and instrumental music.

The school's teams, known as the Garden County Eagles, compete in basketball, football, golf, track, volleyball, and wrestling.

Notable alumni
 Don Meier, creator of Wild Kingdom

References

External links
 Garden County Schools

Educational institutions established in 1915
Schools in Garden County, Nebraska
Public high schools in Nebraska
1915 establishments in Nebraska